Nevus of Ito (also known as "Nevus fuscoceruleus acromiodeltoideus") is a skin condition with similar features to the Nevus of Ota, but occurring in a different distribution.

See also 
 Skin lesion

References

External links 

Melanocytic nevi and neoplasms